Thomas Earle may refer to:
Thomas Earle (American politician), American journalist and politician
Thomas Earle (Canadian politician) (1837–1911), Canadian businessman and Conservative politician
Thomas Earle (MP) (c. 1629–1696), English merchant and politician
Thomas Earle (sculptor) (1810–1876), British sculptor
Tom Earle (born 1966), Canadian author and teacher
Thomas Earle (slave trader) (1754–1822), Liverpool slave trader

See also
Thomas Erle (disambiguation)